Major roads in rural Western Australia connect regional and remote centres of Western Australia, forming the basis of the road network outside of Metropolitan Perth. Main Roads Western Australia controls and maintains these roads and highways.
Some of these roads, or portions of them, are designated and signposted as part of a road route, as they are of national or regional importance.  Additionally, roads through areas of scenic or historic significance are designated as part of a Tourist Drive. Each route has a unique marker: National Highways have gold numbers on a green shield, National Routes have black numbers on a white shield, State Routes have white numbers on a blue shield, Tourist Drives have white numbers on a brown shield.

See also

 List of major roads in Perth, Western Australia
 List of highways in Western Australia
 List of road routes in Western Australia
 Major roads in the Gascoyne region of Western Australia
 Major roads in the Kimberley region of Western Australia
 Major roads in the Mid West region of Western Australia
 Major roads in the Pilbara region of Western Australia
 Major roads in the Wheatbelt region of Western Australia

References

 
Lists of roads in Western Australia